Popularity or social status is the quality of being well liked, admired or well known to a particular group.

Popular may also refer to:

In sociology 
 Popular culture
 Popular fiction
 Popular music
 Popular science
 Populace, the total population of a certain place
 Populism, a political philosophy, based on the idea that the common people are being exploited. 
 Informal usage or custom, as in popular names, as opposed to formal or scientific nomenclature

Companies 
 Popular, Inc., also known as Banco Popular, a financial services company
 Popular Holdings, a Singapore-based educational book company
 The Popular (department store), a chain of department stores in El Paso, Texas, from 1902 to 1995

Media

Music 
"Popular" (Darren Hayes song) (2004), on the album The Tension and the Spark
"Popular" (Eric Saade song) (2011), on the album Saade Vol. 1
"Popular" (M.I.A. song) (2022), from the upcoming album Mata
"Popular" (Nada Surf song) (1996), on the album High/Low
"Popular" (The Veronicas song) (2008), on the album Hook Me Up
"Popular" (Wicked song), in the musical Wicked
Popular, an unreleased album by Van Hunt
"Popular", a song by The Anchoress on the 2015 album Confessions of a Romance Novelist
"Popular", a song by Lil Wayne on the 2010 album I Am Not a Human Being

Printed media
 The Popular Magazine, an American literary magazine that ran for 612 issues from November 1903 to October 1931
 Popular, an Indonesian men's lifestyle magazine

Other media
 Popular (TV series), a teenage dramedy on the WB network
 Popular: Finding Happiness and Success in a World That Cares Too Much About the Wrong Kinds of Relationships, a book by psychology professor Mitch Prinstein

See also
Poplar (disambiguation)
Populaire (disambiguation), French for popular
Populous (disambiguation)